Costley is a surname. Notable people with the surname include:

Madeline Costley, fictional character on the Fox TV series Dollhouse
Edward Costley (1794–1883), New Zealand philanthropist
James Costley (1862–1931), English footballer